Roberto Jimenez is an American-born Ecuadorian grappler and Brazilian jiu-jitsu (BJJ) black belt competitor.

A multiple-time World, Pan and American Nationals champion in juvenile and lower belt divisions, Jimenez is the 2022 ADCC South America Trials winner and the 2022 Polaris middleweight GP champion.

Biography

Early life 
Roberto Francisco Jimenez was born on 19 May 2000 in Miami, Florida, the son of Ecuadorian parents. He started Brazilian jiu-jitsu at the age of 4 encouraged by his father Muay Thai and BJJ practitioner Raul "Gacho" Jimenez. During his first years, the family lived in South America, then when he was 10 moved to Texas where Jimenez joined an Alliance Jiu Jitsu academy. Jimenez went through all the kids BJJ belts before receiving his blue belt.

Early career 
At 15 Jimenez defeated UFC's MMA fighter Sage Northcutt in a grappling competition. In 2016 he was invited to compete at Royal Invitational – The Future of Jiu-Jitsu, his first pro tournament, while he was the youngest competitor he won all his fights via submission. Competing in the super heavyweight division that year he won the 2016 World Jiu-Jitsu Championship as well as the following year in the Juvenile 2 super heavyweight blue division. Jimenez became known for defeating black and brown belts in tournaments such as Fight to Win Europa 2016 where he submitted featherweight black belt Lucas Pinheiro.

At purple belt trained by his father and Lucas Lepri, he became 2018 IBJJF World champion in the adult division after submitting all his opponents, winning double gold in his weight and in openweigh after defeating MMA fighter Mason Fowler in the final. He became known as "The Natural" after a patch on the Gi he was wearing during the competition read: “All Natural Steroid Free BJJ” which prompted a debate about competitors using PEDs. He finished second in February at the ADCC North American West Coast Pro Trials after losing to black belt and MMA fighter DJ Jackson. In August 2018, he was promoted to brown belt level by his father and Romero Jacare Cavalcanti during an Alliance Seminar. In 2019 he became World No-Gi Champion in Absolute, winning silver in his weight class, Pan No-Gi Champion, winning also double gold at the American Nationals (both Gi and No-Gi).  In 2019 he won Pan No-Gi at heavyweight and took bronze in the open class then No-GI World where he won the absolute division after submitting all his opponents but came second in his division.

Black belt career 
At No-GI World 2019 Jimenez was promoted to black belt by his father, On 8 February 2020 Jimenez made his black belt debut at FloGrappling's Who's No. 1 where he defeated against all odds, BJJ grand slam champion Keenan Cornelius 6–4. In July 2020 he entered Third Coast Grappling (3CG) an invitational tournament, at 3CG Kumite III Jimenez defeated Tye Ruotolo in first round on points. At at 3CG Kumite V Jimenez submitted WNO 155 lb champion Kade Ruotolo in the semi-final, before winning the final against his brother Tye Ruotolo again.

In October 2020 Jimenez lost to Craig Jones at WNO 4 then defeated Dante Leon at the December 2020 edition of the tournament via 1 Round Decision. In February 2021at WNO co-main event, he lost to Gordon Ryan, replacing his brother Nicky Ryan who pulled out due to injury. Jimenez submitted four opponents in June 2021 to win Eddie Bravo’s Combat Jiu-Jitsu Worlds welterweight title. At Polaris Squads 3 in August 2021 Jimenez was a member of Team USA who won the tournament. After winning the 2022 ADCC South America Trials, Jimenez entered the 77 kg division of the 2022 ADCC World Championship where he won his first match submitting Andy Varela then lost to future ADCC champion Kade Ruotolo. At Polaris 19 in March 2022 he defeated Magid Hage via rear naked choke submission.

In November 2022, Jimenez won the eight-man bracket Polaris 22 middleweight grand prix after submitting two of three opponents. His submission win over Hunter Colvin at the event was awarded with 'Match of the Year' at the 2022 JitsMagazine BJJ Awards. In February 2023, Jimenez entered the IBJJF London Open, winning the gi and no gi heavyweight division, the no gi absolute division, and getting a silver medal in the gi absolute division.

Championships and accomplishments 
Main Achievements (black belt level):
 ADCC South America Trials winner (2022)
 Polaris MW Grand Prix champion (2022)
 3CG Kumite III – 180 lbs champion (2020)
 3CG Kumite IV – 170 lbs champion (2020)
 IBJJF Rio Summer International No-Gi Open champion (2022)
 IBJJF London International No-Gi Open champion (2023)
 IBJJF London International Open champion (2023)
 2nd place IBJJF London International Open (2023)
 2nd place 3CG Kumite 6 – ABS (2020)
 2nd place IBJJF Rio Summer International Open (2022)
 3rd place IBJJF Rio Summer International Open (2022)

Main Achievements (Colored Belts):
 Fight 2 Win 185 lbs Brown Belt Champion (2019)
 IBJJF World Champion (2018 purple)
 IBJJF World No-Gi Champion (2019 brown)
 IBJJF World Champion Juvenile (2016 / 2017)
 IBJJF World Champion Juvenile No-Gi (2016)
 IBJJF Pans Champion Juvenile (2016 / 2017)
 IBJJF Pans No-Gi Champion (2019 brown)
 IBJJF American Nationals Champion (2019 brown)
 IBJJF IBJJF American Nationals No-Gi Champion(2019 brown)
 IBJJF IBJJF European Open Juvenile Champion (2017)
 IBJJF UAEJJF Grand Slam, TYO Champion (2019 brown)
 IBJJF ROYAL Invitational Champion (2016)
 2nd place IBJJF World Championship No-Gi (2019 brown)
 2nd place IBJJF World Championship Juvenile (2016)
 2nd place UAEJJF Abu Dhabi World Pro (2019 brown)
 2nd place ACBJJ North America Championship (2018 purple)
 3rd place IBJJF World Championship Juvenile No-Gi (2016)
 3rd place IBJJF Pans Championship (2018 purple / 2019 brown)
 3rd place IBJJF Pans Championship No-Gi (2019 brown)
 3rd place UAEJJF Abu Dhabi World Pro (2018 purple)

Personal life 
Jimenez is known for advocating for a steroid free movement in BJJ and living on a plant-based diet.

Notes

References 

Living people
2000 births
Ecuadorian practitioners of Brazilian jiu-jitsu
People awarded a black belt in Brazilian jiu-jitsu
Ecuadorian submission wrestlers
Veganism activists